Hussein Mezzomorto (died 1701) or Hajji Husain Mezzomorto was an Ottoman privateer, bey (governor), and finally Grand Admiral (Kapudan Pasha) of the Ottoman Navy. His epithet mezzomorto is the Italian for "half-dead" and was acquired during a fight with the Spaniards, when he was gravely injured.

Biography

Possibly Turk or a converted Christian from Mallorca, Mezzomorto was mentioned as a captain in 1674. He rose to prominence during the French attacks on Algiers in the early 1680s. He was present for Abraham Duquesne's 1682 bombardment and commanded a fleet of corsairs the next year. The bey of Algiers Baba Hassan handed him over as a hostage to the French, but Mezzomorto persuaded the French admiral to send him back to shore, where he led an insurrection against Baba Hassan, killed him, and took over as bey of Algiers. He then opened fire on the French fleet, forcing Duquesne to raise his blockade. During the 1684 bombardment, he signed a "100 year" treaty with Duquesne. However, the French fleet bombarded Algiers again in 1688, and Mezzomorto retaliated with attacks on the French coast.

As beylerbey of Algiers, Mezzomorto took part in the Morean War between the Turks and Venetians in 1686. He then commanded the fleet in the Danube in 1690, and afterward in the Black Sea. The Venetian threat to the Ottomans' Aegean possessions led to Mezzomorto's appointment as sanjak-bey of Rhodes in 1691.

Distinguishing himself during the reconquest of Chios in early 1695, he was promoted to Kapudan Pasha, acquiring lordship over the Province of the Islands. His primary goal was to expel the Venetians from the Aegean. He defeated a Venetian fleet off Lesbos in September 1695, preventing it from reaching Chios. He commanded at the Battle of Andros in 1696, and on July 5, 1697, defeated a Venetian fleet off Tenedos. On September 3 he  scored another victory, this time off Andros. A battle off Lesbos on September 21, 1698, was interpreted as a victory by each side.

With the support of Sultan Mustafa II, Mezzomorto began a reform of the navy. His reforms were compiled into a book of regulations, the Kannunname, published shortly before his death in 1701. He was buried on Chios.

References

Corsari del Mediterraneo. " Mezzomorto Hassan". 

17th-century births
1701 deaths
Rulers of the Regency of Algiers
Pashas
Ottoman people of the Great Turkish War
Kapudan Pashas
17th-century Algerian people
Algerian people of Spanish descent